Elliot Mintz (born February 16, 1945) is an American consultant. In the 1960s and early 1970s Mintz was an underground radio DJ and host. In the 1970s he became a spokesperson for John Lennon and Yoko Ono, and took on other musicians and actors as clients as a publicist, including Bob Dylan. He later became the publicist for Paris Hilton and Canadian drummer Neil Peart from Rush.

Early life
Mintz was born in the Bronx borough of New York City on February 16, 1945. In 1963 he moved to California to attend Los Angeles City College, partly inspired by the film The Misfits, where he studied broadcasting and began to do radio interviews. Early interviews by Mintz included Jayne Mansfield and Jack Lemmon. His first interview to be broadcast nationally came after the death of John F. Kennedy, when he discovered a classmate of his, Roland Bynum, had known Lee Harvey Oswald while in the US Marines together. The interview was the first character and background interview done about Oswald in the US, and was picked up by the national and international radio broadcast networks. He then became an underground radio D.J. in the 1960s.

Radio and television career
From 1966 to 1968, Elliot Mintz had two shows on KPFK in Los Angeles, California, Looking In and Looking Out. The shows provided a platform for community conversation as well as for interviews Mintz would do with public figures. Each show would begin with a series of rhetorical questions, which listeners could call in to respond to. When he started with KPFK, Mintz was the youngest talkshow host in the US, at the age of 21, broadcasting a nightly radio show on the station. In 1971 he hosted a Kaiser Broadcasting syndicated television show called Headshop that integrated musical guests with film clips shot in and around Southern California.

From 1973 to 1974, Mintz was the entertainment correspondent for Eyewitness News on KABC television in Los Angeles. He also worked on-air at KLAC (1968–69), KMET (1969), and KLOS (1970–71). During this part of his career he interviewed Hollywood actors and recording artists, and lived next door to Timothy Leary. In 1980 Mintz received a California Associated Press, Television, and Radio Association award for his November 30, 1979 radio interview of an Iranian student at the American Embassy in Tehran during the Iran Hostage Crisis. Mintz's interviews include those with Mort Sahl, Norman Mailer, Ray Bradbury, Alan Watts, Salvador Dalí, Jack Lemmon, John Wayne, Groucho Marx, Timothy Leary, Jack Nicholson, Allen Ginsberg, Jayne Mansfield, Raquel Welch, Karen Black, and musicians like John Lennon, Donna Summer, John Coltrane, Stevie Wonder, Ringo Starr, Alice Cooper, and Mick Jagger.

Mintz was the host of the television interview show Head Shop, where he interviewed individuals including Kris Kristofferson. He retired in 2014, upon which he released a website containing his past interviews for download. Other radio stations he worked for include KPPC, KABC, Earth News Radio, Innerview, and Westwood One.

Public relations career
Mintz is a public relations person and spokesperson for individuals and corporate clients. His first client was Bobby Sherman during the 1960s. He also represented John Lennon and Yoko Ono, whom he befriended in 1971. He joined their entourage throughout the 1970s and remains a spokesperson for both the John Lennon Estate and Ono. Other clients of Mintz's have included Christie Brinkley, Crosby, Stills and Nash, Diana Ross, Don Johnson, Janet Jones, Melanie Griffith, and Bob Dylan. During the 2000s Mintz represented Paris Hilton, and appeared on her television show The Simple Life.

John Lennon and Yoko Ono
Though not in a professional capacity, since the death of Lennon, Mintz has acted as a spokesperson for the Lennon estate. In addition, while sifting through Lennon's belongings, he discovered hundreds of unreleased tape recordings including half-finished new songs, early versions of famous hits, and idle thoughts. Beginning in 1988, he hosted a weekly syndicated radio series based upon these recordings called The Lost Lennon Tapes, which was broadcast for about four years. After the show came to an end, Mintz began hosting the spinoff radio program The Beatle Years. Mintz has appeared in feature documentaries about Lennon and Yoko Ono, including The U.S. vs. John Lennon, Imagine: John Lennon and The Real Yoko Ono. In 1985, he was a technical advisor on the television film John and Yoko: A Love Story. He also authored an essay about his relationship with them published in 2005 in a book entitled Memories of John Lennon.

References

External links
 Official website

Living people
Elliot, Mintz
People from Los Angeles
People from the Bronx
American publicists
Radio personalities from Los Angeles
Los Angeles City College alumni